Bakalli is a surname. Notable people with the surname include:

 Adrian Bakalli (born 1976), Belgian footballer 
 Engert Bakalli, Albanian footballer
 Franc Bakalli (born 1997), Albanian footballer
 Hamdi Bakalli (1923–1991), Albanian footballer
 Mahmut Bakalli (1936–2006), Kosovar politician

Albanian-language surnames